199 Park Lane was a British soap opera that aired on BBC1 in 1965. Airing twice a week, the series was set in a luxury block of flats in London.

A total of 18 episodes were broadcast, the first two with the titles "The New Tenant" and "Decision". The series was later wiped by the BBC and no episodes survive in the archives.

References

External links

1965 British television series debuts
1965 British television series endings
1960s British television soap operas
BBC television dramas
British television soap operas
Lost BBC episodes
English-language television shows
Black-and-white British television shows